The 2017–18 Southern Illinois Salukis men's basketball team represented Southern Illinois University Carbondale during the 2017–18 NCAA Division I men's basketball season. The Salukis, led by sixth-year head coach Barry Hinson, played their home games at the SIU Arena in Carbondale, Illinois as members of the Missouri Valley Conference. They finished the season 20–13, 11–7 in MVC play to finish in second place. In the MVC tournament, they defeated Missouri State in the quarterfinals before losing to Illinois State in the semifinals. Despite winning 20 games, the Salukis did not participate in a postseason tournament.

Previous season
The Salukis finished the 2016–17 season 17–16, 9–9 in MVC play to finish in a tie for third place. In the MVC tournament, they defeated Loyola–Chicago in the quarterfinals before losing to Illinois State in the semifinals.

Offseason

Departures

Incoming transfers

2017 recruiting class
Southern Illinois did not have any incoming players in the 2017 recruiting class.

Preseason 
In the conference's preseason poll, the Salukis were picked to finish in fifth place in the MVC. Senior forward Thik Bol was named to the preseason All-MVC second team.

Roster

Schedule and results

|-
!colspan=12 style=| Exhibition

|-
!colspan=12 style=| Non-conference regular season

|-
!colspan=12 style=|  Missouri Valley regular season

|-
!colspan=12 style=|  Missouri Valley tournament

Source

References

2017-18
2017–18 Missouri Valley Conference men's basketball season
2018 in sports in Illinois
2017 in sports in Illinois